Ulf, or Ulv is a masculine name common in Scandinavia and Germany. It derives from the Old Norse word for "wolf" (úlfr, see Wulf). 
The oldest written record of the name's occurrence in Sweden is from a runestone of the 11th century.
The female form is Ylva. 
The given name Ulf was relatively popular during the 20th century, but by the 21st century mostly fell out of fashion.

Notable people
 Ulf the Earl, brother-in-law of Cnut the Great and regent of Denmark
 Ulf Adelsohn, Swedish politician, former leader of Moderata Samlingspartiet and county governor of Stockholm
 Ulf Andersson, Swedish chess player
 Ulf Björlin (1933-1993), Swedish conductor, composer, pianist, arranger, music producer 
 Ulf Dahlén, Swedish ice hockey player
 Ulf Ekberg, Swedish pop musician
 Ulf Ekman, Swedish pastor, leader of Livets Ord
 Ulf Eriksson, Swedish footballer
 Ulf von Euler, Swedish physiologist
 Ulf Fase Swedish jarl during the Middle Ages
 Ulf Friberg (born 1962), Swedish actor and film director
 Ulf Georgsson (born 1962), Swedish songwriter
 Ulf Gustafsson (born 1937), Swedish rower
 Ulf Hamrin (born 1946), Swedish writer 
 Ulf Hohmann, German ethology researcher
 Ulf Isaksson (1954–2003), Swedish ice hockey player
 Ulf Kristersson, Swedish politician
 Ulf Kirsten, German soccer player
 Ulf Larsson, Swedish actor and TV host
 Ulf Linde, Swedish art critic, writer, museum director
 Ulf Lönnqvist, Swedish politician
 Ulf Lundell, Swedish author and rock musician
 Ulf Lundkvist, Swedish comic creator, illustrator, and painter
 Ulf Nilsson, Swedish ice hockey player
 Ulf Olsson, Swedish murderer
 Ulf Ottosson, Swedish soccer player, Mål-Otto
 Ulf Merbold, German astronaut (retired) and glider pilot
 Ulf Palme, Swedish film actor
 Ulf Pilgaard, Danish actor
 Ulf the Quarrelsome, brother (or sometimes identified as stepson) to Brian Boru
 Ulf Samuelsson, Swedish ice hockey player
 Ulf Schmidt, Swedish tennis player
 Ulf Timmermann, East German shot putter

See also
ULF (disambiguation)

Scandinavian masculine given names
Swedish masculine given names
Swedish-language surnames